The Critérium des As (Race of the Aces) was a cycle race that was generally held at the end of the season, with entry by invitation only, for the leading riders of the season. Competitors rode behind pacers on tandems or motorcycles. It was held from 1921 until 1990, mostly in Paris, France but also in Switzerland and Holland. The last Critérium des As was held in 1990 and was replaced by the Roue d'Or des As the following year.

History
In 1920 the Critérium de la résistance was run from Bordeaux to Paris (Longchamp) and back to Bordeaux, and is regarded as the forerunner of Critérium des As. The  paced event was won by Louis Mottiat of Belgium, in 56 hours and 48 minutes.

In 1921 the best riders of the season were invited to enter the Critérium des As, 27 laps of a 3.63 km circuit around Longchamp. They rode alone except for pacers who helped on occasional laps, not being fast enough to last longer.

Crowds of up to 6,000 watched in the years before the World War II. The individual pacers were replaced by tandems, triplets, motorcycles and finally specialist Derny lightweight motorcycles in 1947. René de Latour, a journalist who organised the race in 1943, when the inside of the circuit included flak guns to defend the Renault factory in Boulogne-Billancourt, said: 

The most prolific winner was Rik Van Steenbergen of Belgium, with five wins.

Winners

Notes

References

Cycle races in France
Defunct cycling races
Recurring sporting events established in 1921
1921 establishments in France
Recurring sporting events disestablished in 1990
Men's road bicycle races
1990 disestablishments in France